Juan Carlos Valenzuela Hernández (born 15 May 1984) is a Mexican former professional footballer who played as a centre-back. He is popularly known by his nickname "Topo".

Club career

Atlas
Valenzuela came up from the Atlas youth system, debuting in Clausura 2003 against future club Tecos UAG.

América
In Clausura 2008 he was acquired by Tecos where his performance arouse the interest of Club América and the Mexico national team. Valenzuela made his debut for América against Chivas in the 2009 InterLiga.

Tijuana
On December 11, 2015 Club Tijuana announced that Valenzuela would be their new signing for the Clausura 2016 in hope of reinforcing their defense. The newly appointed manager, Miguel Herrera chose Valenzuela because of their experience together in his ex team Club America.

International career

Mexico national team
Valenzuela debuted on 24 September 2008 against Chile. He started in the 2009 Gold Cup semi-final and final, winning the championship with Mexico. He made the preliminary list for the 2010 World Cup, getting cut prior to their "farewell" game in Mexico City.

In October 2013, Valenzuela was called up to play the World Cup intercontinental playoff matches against New Zealand by Miguel Herrera.

Career statistics

International

International goals
Scores and results list Peru's goal tally first.

Honours
América
Liga MX: Clausura 2013, Apertura 2014

Mexico
CONCACAF Gold Cup: 2009

References

External links

Liga MX profile

1984 births
Living people
People from Guaymas
Indigenous Mexicans
Atlas F.C. footballers
Tecos F.C. footballers
Club América footballers
Club Tijuana footballers
Leones Negros UdeG footballers
Liga MX players
CONCACAF Gold Cup-winning players
2009 CONCACAF Gold Cup players
2013 CONCACAF Gold Cup players
2015 Copa América players
Mexico international footballers
Footballers from Sonora
Association football defenders
Mexican footballers